Zaphir's shrew (Crocidura zaphiri) is a species of mammal in the family Soricidae. It is found in Ethiopia and Kenya. Its natural habitats are subtropical and tropical dry and moist lowland forests.

Sources
 Hutterer, R. & Oguge, N. 2004.  Crocidura zaphiri.   2006 IUCN Red List of Threatened Species.   Downloaded on 30 July 2007.

Zaphir's shrew
Mammals of Ethiopia
Mammals of Kenya
Zaphir's shrew
Taxonomy articles created by Polbot